Plasmopara nivea is a plant pathogen infecting carrots.

References

Water mould plant pathogens and diseases
Carrot diseases
Species described in 1886
Peronosporales